Lead Me On may refer to:

Albums
 Lead Me On (Amy Grant album), or the title song (see below)
 Lead Me On (Kelly Joe Phelps album), or the title song
 Lead Me On (Loretta Lynn and Conway Twitty album), or the title song (see below)

Songs
 "Lead Me On" (Amy Grant song)
 "Lead Me On" (1971 Steve Lawrence and Eydie Gorme song) from the album The World Of Steve & Eydie
 "Lead Me On" (Loretta Lynn and Conway Twitty song)
 "Lead Me On" (Maxine Nightingale song)
 "Lead Me On" (Teena Marie song) from the motion picture Top Gun

See also 
"Leading Me On", a song by Monrose from Strictly Physical
Lean on Me (disambiguation)